The 1930 Southern Conference men's basketball tournament took place from February 28–March 4, 1930, at Municipal Auditorium in Atlanta, Georgia. The Alabama Crimson Tide won their first Southern Conference title, led by head coach Hank Crisp.

Bracket

* Overtime game

Championship

All-Southern tournament team

See also
List of Southern Conference men's basketball champions

References

Tournament
Southern Conference men's basketball tournament
Southern Conference men's basketball tournament
Southern Conference men's basketball tournament
Southern Conference men's basketball tournament